WCCO II was an early local cable channel serving the Minneapolis area. The channel was owned by Midwest Communications and meant to complement programming on broadcast station WCCO-TV.

History
The network, launched by Midwest Radio and Television (later Midwest Communications) in 1982 was described as an "experimental cable channel", originally filled much of its schedule with rebroadcasts of WCCO's newscasts and ESPN's SportsCenter, as well as programming from the Financial News Network. A second cable channel called WCCO Cable Weather Channel was also launched at the same time, initially providing automated weather forecasts 24 hours a day before transitioning into providing live weather forecasts in early 1983. In 1985, an agreement was made to fill most of WCCO II's schedule with music videos produced by K-TWIN. A few hours were reserved for rebroadcasts of newscasts and other programming.

On March 1, 1989, WCCO II was relaunched as the Midwest Sports Channel (later Fox Sports North, now Bally Sports North) when it acquired rights to Twins broadcasts.

References

Television channels and stations established in 1982
Television channels and stations disestablished in 1989
1982 establishments in Minnesota
1989 disestablishments in Minnesota
Television stations in Minneapolis–Saint Paul